The AIB International Media Excellence Awards - the AIBs - were created in 2005 by the Association for International Broadcasting. 

The AIBs recognise excellence in the international broadcasting industry and attract entries from broadcasters all over the world. In 2008, well over 300 entries were received, competing for 12 Awards.

The 2010 AIBs  were presented in London at LSO St Luke's on Tuesday 9 November, including the new People's Choice award which rewarded the best coverage of climate change by a TV network.

External links
Official site
Association for International Broadcasting site

Broadcasting awards